Héctor Pizana Pascual (born 7 February 1995) is a Spanish footballer who plays for Club Atlético Pulpileño as a goalkeeper.

Club career
Born in Los Montesinos, Alicante, Valencian Community, Pizana finished his graduation with Valencia CF. On 18 July 2014 he moved to Albacete Balompié, being assigned to the reserves in Tercera División.

On 19 August 2015 Pizana signed a new three-year deal with Alba. On 9 September he made his first team debut, starting in a 1–2 away loss against UE Llagostera, for the season's Copa del Rey.

On 19 September 2015 Pizana made his Segunda División debut, starting and being sent off after committing a penalty in a 1–1 away draw against CD Mirandés. Ahead of the 2016–17 season, he was definitely promoted to the first team in Segunda División B.

On 4 August 2017, Pizana was loaned to CD Guijuelo in the third division, for one year. In October, he suffered a serious knee injury which kept him out for the remainder of the season, and terminated his contract with Alba on 27 July 2018.

On 29 July 2018, Pizana signed for CDA Navalcarnero in the third tier.

References

External links

1995 births
Living people
People from Vega Baja del Segura
Sportspeople from the Province of Alicante
Spanish footballers
Footballers from the Valencian Community
Association football goalkeepers
Segunda División players
Segunda División B players
Tercera División players
Valencia CF Mestalla footballers
Atlético Albacete players
Albacete Balompié players
CD Guijuelo footballers
CDA Navalcarnero players